Major General Salem Ali Qatan (1952 – 18 June 2012) was a Yemeni military officer and member of the Al-Awaliq tribe. He was born in Yashbem in As Said District, Shabwah Governorate. He was married, and joined the military in 1970. As the chief military commander in south Yemen, Qatan had led a month-long offensive against terrorist organization al-Qaeda, leading to its withdrawal from several towns and villages in the Abyan and Shabwa provinces of Yemen which it had controlled since 2011. Ali Qatan was appointed in March 2012, succeeding Major General Mahdi Maqouleh just days after the newly elected President of Yemen, Abdrabuh Mansur Hadi took office and pledged to destroy al-Qaeda in the Arabian Peninsula once and for all.

Death

Assassination
On 18 June 2012, Qatan was killed in the port city of Aden by a suicide bomber. According to a report by Chinese news agency Xinhua, Yemeni militants had assassinated Qatan in response to the army offensive in the south of Yemen. A spokesperson for the Yemeni militants told the news agency, "One of our jihadists succeeded in assassinating Gen Salem Ali Qatan who had led a month-long offensive against our families and strongholds in Abyan." In an interview with Agence France-Presse, an anonymous medical officer for Qatan, mentioned that the attacker "handed Qatan a piece of paper, shook his hand and then detonated himself" as the general was on his way to his office. According to witnesses, the assassin was wearing an explosives belt.

The Defence Ministry of Yemen said a suicide bomber had hurled himself towards Qatan's car, and that two soldiers escorting him were killed too in the process. It identified the suicide bomber as a Somali but disclosed no other details. A doctor at the hospital where Qatan died said 12 other people, 9 of them being soldiers, were seriously wounded.

Response
Ali Mansur, a veteran army commander and close aide to Qatan, described the general's death as "a huge loss for Yemen". Speaking to Agence France-Presse via telephone, he gave Qatan one hundred percent credit for the recent victories in the battles against the insurgents. Said Mansur, "In just three months, Qatan achieved major progress towards chasing down and eliminating" the fighters from their strongholds."

Funeral
Qatan was given a state funeral in Sanaa, Yemen, on 20 June 2012, where hundreds of people gathered.

References

2012 deaths
Yemeni military officers
1952 births
People from Shabwah Governorate
Yemeni military personnel killed in action